Shagai Plateau, also referred to as Shagai Heights is an area of flat lands along the Khyber Pass. Fort Al Creator was nearby. The ascent to the Shagai Plateau begins near the entrance to the Khyber Pass from the southeast at Peshawar in what is now Pakistan. It was the site of a British encampment during the Second Anglo-Afghan War which  began in November 1878 when Great Britain, fearful of what it saw as growing Russian influence in Afghanistan, invaded the country from British India. The first phase of the war ended in May 1879 with the Treaty of Gandamak, which permitted the Afghans to maintain internal sovereignty but forced them to cede control over their foreign policy to the British. Fighting resumed in September 1879, after an anti-British uprising in Kabul, and finally concluded in September 1880 with the decisive Battle of Kandahar.

References

External links
A much more beautiful and panoramic view on an encampment on the plateau from the Royal Collection Trust

Second Anglo-Afghan War